This article lists the in the water and on the water forms of aquatic sports for 2013.

Aquatics
January 27 – October 5: FINA 10 km Marathon Swimming World Cup 2013
January 27 at Santos, Brazil
Men's winner:  Romain Beraud
Women's winner:  Emily Brunemann
February 2 at Viedma, Argentina
Men's winner:  Romain Beraud
Women's winner:  Emily Brunemann
March 1 at Eilat, Israel
Men's winner:  Christian Reichert
Women's winner:  Ana Marcela Cunha
April 15 at Cozumel, Mexico
Men's winner:  Daniel Fogg
Women's winner:  Martina Grimaldi
July 25 at Lac Saint-Jean, Quebec, Canada
Men's winner:  Alexander Studzinsky
Women's winner:  Emily Brunemann
August 10 at Lac-Mégantic, Quebec, Canada
Men's winner:  Thomas Lurz
Women's winner:  Martina Grimaldi
September 29 at Shantou, China
Men's winner:  Thomas Lurz
Women's winner:  Poliana Okimoto
October 5 at 
Men's winner:  Samuel de Bona
Women's winner:  Poliana Okimoto
March 15 – May 26: FINA Diving World Cup 2013
Men's 3m springboard overall winner:  Yahel Castillo
Men's 10m platform overall winner:  Victor Minibaev
Men's 3m springboard synchro overall winner: 
Men's 10m platform synchro overall winner: 
Women's 3m springboard overall winner:  He Zi
Women's 10m platform overall winner:  Si Yajie
Women's 3m springboard synchro overall winner: 
Women's 10m platform synchro overall winner: 
July 19 – August 4: 2013 World Aquatics Championships in Barcelona, Spain
 The  United States won both the gold and overall medal tallies.
August 7 – November 14: FINA Swimming World Cup 2013
Overall men's winner:  Chad le Clos
Overall women's winner:  Katinka Hosszú

Canoe sprint (flatwater racing)
 May 10 – June 2: 2013 ICF Canoe Sprint World Cup
 May 10–12 at  Szeged
  won both gold and overall medal tallies.
 May 17–19 at  Račice
  won both gold and overall medal tallies.
 May 31 – June 2 at  Poznań
  won the gold medal count;  won the overall medal count.
 June 14–16: 2013 Canoe Sprint European Championships in  Montemor-o-Velho
  won the gold medal count;  won the overall medal count.
 August 1–4: 2013 ICF Junior and U23 Canoe Sprint World Championships in  Welland
  won the gold medal tally;  won the overall medal tally.
 August 27 – September 1: 2013 ICF Canoe Sprint World Championships in  Duisburg
  won the gold medal tally;  won the overall medal tally. (Canoe category)
  won both the gold and overall medal tallies in the Paracanoe category.

Rowing
 March 22–24: Samsung World Rowing Cup (I) at  Sydney
Overall winner: 
 June 21–23: Samsung World Rowing Cup (II) at  Eton Dorney
Overall winner: 
 July 12–14: Samsung World Rowing Cup (III) at  Lucerne
Overall winner: 
 July 24–28: 2013 World Rowing U23 Championships at  Linz-Ottensheim
However,  won the overall medal tally.
 August 7–11: 2013 World Rowing Junior Championships in  Trakai
 won both the gold and overall medal tallies.
 August 25 – September 1: 2013 World Rowing Championships in  Chungju

Sailing (yachting)
 December 2, 2012 – April 27, 2013: ISAF Sailing World Cup
  wins both the gold and overall medal tallies.
 July 13–20: 2013 ISAF Youth Sailing World Championships in  Limassol
 There were eight nations with, at least, one gold medal each. That is equal to all eligible events in this championship. However,  gets top spot here because of one silver medal that was won, along with the one gold medal.  won the overall medal tally.
 September 7–25: 2013 America's Cup at San Francisco
  Oracle Team USA defeated  Emirates Team New Zealand 9–8, to defend the American team's Cup win from 2010.

Water polo
 September 26, 2012 – June 1, 2013: 2012–13 LEN Champions League
 Winner:  VK Crvena Zvezda (first title).
 November 22, 2012 – April 27, 2013: 2012–13 LEN Women's Champions' Cup
 Winner:  CN Sabadell (second title).
 June 1–6: Women's 2013 FINA Water Polo World League super final in  Beijing
 Champions: ; Second: ; Third: 
 June 11–16: Men's 2013 FINA Water Polo World League super final in  Chelyabinsk
 Champions: ; Second: ; Third: 
Water polo at the 2013 World Aquatics Championships – Men's tournament
 Champions:  (third title); Second: ; Third: 
Water polo at the 2013 World Aquatics Championships – Women's tournament
 Champions:  (first title); Second: ; Third:

Whitewater (canoe) slalom
 June 21 – August 25: 2013 Canoe Slalom World Cup
 June 21–23 at  Cardiff
 Overall winner: 
 June 28–30 at  Augsburg
 Gold medal winner: ; Overall medal winner: 
 July 5–7 at  La Seu d'Urgell
 August 16–18 at  Ljubljana – Tacen
 Host nation, won both the gold and overall medal tallies.
 August 23–25: World Cup Final at  Bratislava – Čunovo
  won the gold medal tally.  and host nation, tied in the overall medal tally.
 July 17–21: 2013 ICF Canoe Slalom Junior and U23 World Championships at  Liptovský Mikuláš
 Gold medal winners (tie):  and the  host team; Overall medal winner: 
 September 12–15: 2013 ICF Canoe Slalom World Championships in Prague

References

 
2013 in sports
Water sports by year
Aquatics